The Howa 1500 or  is a bolt-action rifle produced in Japan by Howa Machinery.
Introduced in 1979, it has been used by hunters as a hunting rifle with various cartridge offerings. It is also utilized by military and law enforcement elements as a sniper rifle. It is sold under the name of Howa Model 1500 Rifle for overseas markets.

Overview
The M1500 was a fully new rifle, following the Howa Golden Bear hunting rifle that Howa Industries manufactured previously. When designing the M1500, Howa used the Weatherby Mark V - which was manufactured by Howa Industries on an OEM basis - as the reference. However, whereas Mark V's bolt opening / closing angle is 54 degrees narrow, the M1500 uses the more general 90 degree opening / closing angle.

At present, the M1500 is one of three large-calibre bolt-action rifle platforms produced in Japan, and is sold as Howa's representative rifle not only in Japan, but throughout the world.  The others are the Browning AB3 and X-Bolt platforms, produced by Miroku, located in Kochi, Japan.

In terms of the mechanism as a bolt action, it is classified as a Mauser type one-piece structure, cock-on opening. The trigger is a two-stage trigger that enhances precision shooting. In 2011, a new two-stage trigger system called HACT (Howa Actuator Controlled Trigger) was introduced.

The safety device is a relatively rudimentary in design, that locks the trigger, but it uses a US patented three-position system that has a safety position where only the trigger is locked and a safety position where the bolt is locked at the same time as the trigger.

The internal magazine can hold 3–5 rounds, loaded through the open action, similar to the Type 38 infantry rifle.For models sold overseas, there is option for removable box magazine system for Model 1500 as well. These magazines come with 5- and 10-round capacity.

Barrels are chromoly, not chrome-lined as seen on arms of the Type 64 rifle. Barrels are offered in both sporting length, weight and profile as well as Varmint length and weight.  All guns circulating within Japan undergo fire-testing at the Toyokazu Company, and every new rifle has its paper test target enclosed with the firearm.

There are two main products for the domestic market. The Deluxe model fitted with open sights and the sightless varmint-hunting model, known as the "Heavy Barrel". Both versions are available either blued or in stainless steel, for a total of four models on sale, independent of caliber. Short action and long action calibers are available including, but not limited to .22-250, .223 Remington, .204 Ruger, 6.5×55mm, .300 Winchester Magnum, .308 Winchester, .30-06, .338 Winchester Magnum, .375 Ruger, so the user can freely choose to suit his purpose. In 2015, Howa introduced the "mini action" for .223 Remington, 7.62x39, 6.5 mm Grendel. Since introduction of mini-action, in certain markets, short action is now called "standard action".

For foreign exports, the barreled action with trigger mechanism are also supplied in a stripped-down form to various small arms manufacturers. It is common that a maker will choose and attach its own gunstock to Howa's barreled actions, and then sell it under their own brand. Weatherby Vanguard is such an example. Previously, Smith & Wesson, O.F. Mossberg & Sons and Inter-Arms sold them as the M1500. Currently in the United States, Legacy Sports International, a firearms manufacturer and distributor in Reno, Nevada, markets and sells bolt-action rifles that use the Howa M1500 barreled action. Their latest rifle to use the Howa M1500 barreled action is the HCR (Howa Chassis Rifle) which accepts some AR-15 components

For overseas specifications, the M1500 standard 24-inch (about 60 cm) barrel was shortened to 22 inches (about 56 cm) in 1982, and the M1700LS was made lighter by omitting iron sights like the heavy barrel on the assumption that it would be used in a scope. In 1985, at the request of Mossberg, the M1550, which was based on the M1500 and had a 5-box magazine specification from the beginning, was additionally sold, but both are now discontinued.

In addition, among the models sold overseas, if a defect in the rifle's bolt is detected, Howa will provide a new bolt, free of charge, for the target serial number.

The M1500, while being comparatively low priced compared to other overseas models, has been judged to have all the delicacy and robustness one would expect from Japanese engineering. In a live-fire test by overseas enthusiasts, a video showing that succeeful sniping of an empty can from 800 yards (730 meters) away was released.

Spare parts have also sold fairly well, however starting with the incursion of Remington into the Japanese domestic market, foreign companies with stronger brand recognition and more competitive prices have caused M1500 sales to become sluggish. For this reason, more than 95% of Howa's M1500 are produced in stripped down form for overseas export.

In March 2020, the Howa 1500 was the third best-selling bolt-action rifle in the United States.

Variants
 Three action lengths:
 Howa 1500 Mini action: .223 Rem, 7.62x39 mm, 6.5 mm Grendel
 Howa 1500 Short action: .22-250, .223 Rem, .204 Ruger, 6.5 Creedmoor, 6.5×55 mm, .308 Win. 
 Howa 1500 Long action: .30-06 Springfield.300 Win Mag, .338 Win Mag, 7 mm Rem Mag, .375 Ruger
 Hogue - with  barrel options
 Alpine Mountain -  lightweight barrel
 Scout - Scout rifle with  threaded barrel, available in .308 Winchester only.
 HCR (Howa Chassis Rifle) - accepts AR-15-style furniture for customization.
 HS Precision -  Standard Barrel or  Semi Heavy Barrel

Adoption

Japanese Law Enforcement
The M1500 was originally a hunting rifle, but Prefectural police departments in Japan have adopted them as sniper rifles. This model was designated "Heavy Barrel." Heavy barreled "Varmint" or colloquially, "Sniper" rifles are fitted with longer, heavier barrels to increase projectile velocity, resist heat soak, and provide more repeatable shots.

In addition, the Japanese police stipulate that equipment other than pistols are referred to as special guns, and the ordnance name of M1500 is Special Gun Type-I (殊銃I型, Koto jū I-gata). The Police M1500 has a wooden stock with a bipod and a scoped sight.

In addition to the police, M1500 are also introduced in the Special Assault Team, Special Security Team, anti-firearms squad, and the Fukui Prefectural Police's Nuclear Special Guard Unit. 

It is also utilized by Japan Coast Guard. However, on the ocean, it is said that the Howa Type 64 designated marksman rifles that is easier to fire faster than M1500 are used more frequently.

Japanese Self-Defense Forces
It was adopted as a successor to the long-used M1 Garand as a new ceremonial gun for the special ceremonial corps formed from the 302nd Security Police Squadron. After testing and evaluation purchase, in 2018, SDF ordered 240 guns as ceremonial rifles for 65,520,000 yen, (648,000 yen per unit.) It was used by the honor guard and was seen in use at the Japan-Singapore Defense Ministry meeting between Defense Minister Iwaya and Defense Minister Eun Enhen.

Ukraine
The Armed Forces of Ukraine's 3rd Special Purpose Regiment (Kropyvnytskyi) has adopted a type called "Hogue 20" as a sniper rifle. The ammunition used is .308 Winchester ammunition, and the mount has been changed to Picatinny Rail. It is also used by the Azov Battalion.

Notes

References

 Monthly "GUN" May 2011 issue "Howa M1500 Howa Sporting Bolt Action Rifle" Text: Truk Takano Published: International Publishing 2011

See also
 Howa Machinery, Ltd.
 SIG Sauer 200 STR
 Tikka T3

External links
 Howa Rifles Official page
 Official Page - Howa Model 1500 Rifle
 Legacy Sports Int'l - Official Howa M1500 Product Line

Hunting rifles
Bolt-action rifles of Japan
Sniper rifles of Japan
Police weapons